Loney Dear is a self-titled sixth studio album by Swedish singer-songwriter Loney, Dear. It was released 29 September 2017 through Real World Records.

Track listing

Charts

References

2017 albums
Loney, Dear albums
Real World Records albums